The Church of St. Cyril and Methodius (until 1945 St. Anne's Church) is an orthodox church in Wrocław, Poland. It is located on the Wyspa Piasek.

History
The original church of St. Anne was built between 1686 and 1690 for the Augustinian nuns in baroque style. In the Middle Ages, a chapel dedicated to St. Joseph stood on the site. This was destroyed at the beginning of the 17th century.

After the secularization in 1810, the church was transferred to the Catholic seminary. Between 1919 and 1921 the church served the Polish minority of the town as a Catholic church. Later, the Church of St. Anne went to the Old Catholic Church.

During the Second World War, the church was used to store almost half a million books from Wrocław University Library. During the Battle of Wrocław, the church was badly destroyed and burned out completely, along with the books. After the war, minor security measures were initially implemented.

In 1970, the building went to the city's Orthodox community. It was rebuilt and could be used again in 1976 as the first orthodox church of the city.

References

 Klaus Klöppel: Breslau – Niederschlesien und seine tausendjährige Hauptstadt. Trescher Verlag, Berlin 2014, S. 94

External links

Churches in Wrocław
Baroque church buildings in Poland
Eastern Orthodox churches in Poland
Churches completed in 1690